Lugovskoye is a rural locality (a selo) and the administrative center of Lugovsky Selsoviet, Zonalny District, Altai Krai, Russia. The population was 1,163 as of 2013. There are 16 streets.

Geography 
Lugovskoye is located 28 km northeast of Zonalnoye (the district's administrative centre) by road. Novy Byt is the nearest rural locality.

References 

Rural localities in Zonalny District